Ventura County Community College District (VCCCD) is the system of public community colleges in Ventura County, California. The district is a member of the California Community Colleges System. VCCCD member colleges are Ventura College in Ventura, California, Moorpark College in Moorpark, California and Oxnard College in Oxnard, California. The district was formed in 1962 after previous administration of Ventura College had been in combination with the Ventura High School District.

The district offices share a building with the Ventura Unified School District at 255 W. Stanley Ave., Ventura. The building was the corporate headquarters for Kinkos until 2002.

Member colleges

Ventura College

It also operates a satellite campus in Santa Paula, California.

Moorpark College

Moorpark College opened in 1967.

Oxnard College

Oxnard College's first classes were held in Ramona School starting in 1969 with the current campus opening in 1975.

References

External links
 Official website

Schools accredited by the Western Association of Schools and Colleges
Universities and colleges in Ventura County, California
California Community Colleges
1962 establishments in California
School districts established in 1962